Narda may refer to:
Narda, Hungary, a village in Hungary
Narda Onyx, an American actress
Narda, a character in Mandrake the Magician
Narada, a Hindu mythological character also spelled Narda
Narda, a fictional Filipino character that embodies the superhero Darna
Narda, a Philippine rock band
"Narda", a 2006 song by Kamikazee from the album Maharot
Narda, a supplier of measuring equipment for EMF and RF safety, test & measurement

See also
Narada (disambiguation)